Marquino Mindley (born 29 December 1994) is a Jamaican cricketer. Who plays international cricket for the West Indies cricket team.He was part of the West Indies' squad for the 2014 ICC Under-19 Cricket World Cup. In May 2018, he was selected to play for the Barbados national cricket team in the Professional Cricket League draft, ahead of the 2018–19 season. In October 2019, he was named in Jamaica's squad for the 2019–20 Regional Super50 tournament. He made his Test debut in December 2022.

In June 2020, Mindley was named as one of eleven reserve players in the West Indies' Test squad, for their series against England. The Test series was originally scheduled to start in May 2020, but was moved back to July 2020 due to the COVID-19 pandemic.

References

External links
 

1994 births
Living people
Jamaican cricketers
Place of birth missing (living people)
Jamaica cricketers
Barbados cricketers